Tree test may mean:
 Tree testing, a method of evaluating topic trees for findability
 Baum test, projective drawing technique developed by Karl Koch